Rapid serial visual presentation (RSVP) is a scientific method for studying the timing of vision. In RSVP, a sequence of stimuli are shown to an observer at one location in their visual field. The observer is instructed to report one of these stimuli - the target - which has a feature that differentiates it from the rest of the stream. For instance, observers may see a sequence of stimuli consisting of grey letters with the exception of one red letter. They are told to report the red letter. People make errors in this task in the form of reports of stimuli that occurred before or after the target. The position in time of the letter they report, relative to the target, is an estimate of the timing of visual selection on that trial.

The term, and methodologies to study it, was first introduced by Mary C. Potter.

Peripheral reading
Peripheral reading is vital to those suffering from central field loss, which is most commonly seen in the elderly.  Factors which might limit one's peripheral reading rate include acuity, crowding, and eye movements.  Many find difficulty making the correct eye movements for peripheral reading, but the dependence on eye movements can be minimized through the presentation format of RSVP.

See also
 Attentional blink
 The term Rapid Serial Visual Presentation is also used in Information Visualization to describe a computer interface technique proposed in 2002 by Robert Spence (engineer), in which a collection of images is presented sequentially and rapidly to help find an image of interest.

References

Ophthalmology